Sthenomerus is an extinct genus of Diprotodontia.

References

 Dinosaur Encyclopedia by Jayne Parsons (page 207)

Prehistoric vombatiforms
Prehistoric marsupial genera
Fossil taxa described in 1907